Moment is Japanese J-pop band Speed's greatest hits album following their first album, Starting Over and second album, Rise. Moment was released on December 16, 1998 and contains all the commercially released singles from their first and second albums along with additional tracks. Debuting at number 1 on the Oricon charts and eventually selling 2.32 million copies, Moment is the best-selling album by a female group in Japanese music history.

Track listing
 White Love
 All My True Love
 Steady
 Wake Me Up! (Growin' Up Mix)
 Alive
 Body & Soul
  — (Sassy (Love Version))
 Go! Go! Heaven
  — (Tropical Night)
 Luv Vibration
 My Graduation
 White Love (Christmas Standard)
 White Love (Christmas Standard) ~Instrumental~

References

Speed (Japanese band) albums
1998 greatest hits albums